Pedersöre (before 1989 ) is a municipality of Finland. Its seat is in Bennäs.

It is located in the province of Western Finland and is part of the Ostrobothnia region.

Neighbouring municipalities are Evijärvi, Kauhava, Kronoby, Larsmo, Jakobstad and Nykarleby.

The municipality is bilingual, with the majority speaking Swedish and the minority Finnish. The municipality is made up of many smaller villages, the most significant being Bennäs, Kållby, Edsevö, Esse, Ytteresse, and Purmo.

History

Pedersöre was first mentioned in 1348 in a trade statute issued by king Magnus Eriksson. The municipalities Esse and Purmo separated from Pedersöre in 1865, only to return in 1977.

Economy

Agriculture and shipbuilding have been the traditional industries in Pedersöre.

References

External links

Municipality of Pedersöre  – Official website
Kållby on the web